Floricomus is a genus of North American dwarf spiders that was first described by C. R. Crosby & S. C. Bishop in 1925.

Species
 it contains thirteen species, found in Canada and the United States:
Floricomus bishopi Ivie & Barrows, 1935 – USA
Floricomus crosbyi Ivie & Barrows, 1935 – USA
Floricomus littoralis Chamberlin & Ivie, 1935 – USA
Floricomus mulaiki Gertsch & Davis, 1936 – USA
Floricomus nasutus (Emerton, 1911) – USA
Floricomus nigriceps (Banks, 1906) – USA
Floricomus ornatulus Gertsch & Ivie, 1936 – USA
Floricomus plumalis (Crosby, 1905) – USA
Floricomus praedesignatus Bishop & Crosby, 1935 – USA, Canada
Floricomus pythonicus Crosby & Bishop, 1925 – USA
Floricomus rostratus (Emerton, 1882) (type) – USA
Floricomus setosus Chamberlin & Ivie, 1944 – USA
Floricomus tallulae Chamberlin & Ivie, 1944 – USA

See also
 List of Linyphiidae species (A–H)

References

Araneomorphae genera
Linyphiidae
Spiders of North America